Sletsjøe is a Norwegian surname. Notable people with the surname include:

Arne Sletsjøe (born 1960), Norwegian mathematician and retired sprint canoer 
Arne Sletsjøe (1916–1999), Norwegian violist

Norwegian-language surnames